Gadzhi Abidovich Bamatov (born 16 February 1982) is a former Russian football player.

He represented Russia at the 1999 UEFA European Under-16 Championship.

External links
 

1982 births
Footballers from Makhachkala
Living people
Russian footballers
Association football forwards
FC Anzhi Makhachkala players
Russian Premier League players
FC Fakel Voronezh players